"Two Tickets to Paradise" is a song by American rock singer Eddie Money from his 1977 self-titled debut album, Eddie Money. It was released as a single in June 1978 and reached number 22 on the Billboard Hot 100. The song has since become a staple of classic rock radio, and it was Eddie Money's signature song.

Reception
Cash Box called it "an excellent, punchy rocker," saying that the guitars are "fluid and engaging" and the vocals are "rough and ready."

Usage in media
Homer Simpson sings a part of this song in the episode of ‘’Homer Loves Flanders’’ by The Simpsons.

The track was featured on fictional radio station K-DST in Grand Theft Auto: San Andreas.

Musical
The song title was also used for the title of a musical play, the  story of Eddie Money's life and musical career.

Chart history

References

Eddie Money songs
1978 singles
1977 songs
Song recordings produced by Bruce Botnick
Songs written by Eddie Money
Columbia Records singles